Platycerota is a genus of moths in the family Geometridae.

Description
Palpi hairy and not reaching beyond frons. Antennae of male flattened and thickened with appressed serrations. Hind tibia not dilated. Forewings with rounded apex. Vein 3 from before angle of cell and vein 5 from above middle of discocellulars. Veins 7,8,9 stalked from before angle of cell. Veins 10,11 stalked and vein 11 anastomosing with vein 12 and veins 10 with 8 and 9. Hindwings with vein 3 from before angle of cell.

References

Baptini